Michael Molyns (born 1602) was an English politician who sat in the House of Commons in 1625.

Molyns was the son of Sir Barentyne Molyns of Clapcot (now in the parish of Brightwell-cum-Sotwell, Oxfordshire) and Elizabeth Southwell daughter of Thomas Southwell of Woodrising, Norfolk and Nazareth Newton. He was the grandson of the earlier Michael Molyns MP, and the half-brother of Walter Devereux.

He matriculated at St John's College, Oxford on 15 November 1616 at the age of 15. In 1625, he was elected Member of Parliament for Wallingford.

References

1602 births
Year of death missing
English MPs 1625
People from Brightwell-cum-Sotwell